The prime minister of Brunei is the head of government of Brunei. Concurrently, the title is held by the sultan of Brunei, who as sultan is also the head of state of the country. As the prime minister, the Sultan and Yang Di-Pertuan is the head of both the ministerial cabinet and the Legislative Council of Brunei.

The office was created as soon as Brunei declared independence from British Empire in 1984. The office replaced the Chief Minister (Menteri Besar) of Brunei or the chief minister of Brunei.

List

Rank by time in office

Prime Minister's Office

The Prime Minister's Office of Brunei is located near the Edinburgh Palace (Istana Edinburgh) in Airport Lama, Berakas northeast of Bandar Seri Begawan.

See also
 Government of Brunei
 Politics of Brunei

References

Monarchy in Brunei
 
Lists of prime ministers by country